Arpine is a feminine given name in the Armenian language that holds the meaning of "sun".

People with the given-name 

 Arpine Gabrielyan (born 1989), Armenian broadcaster, model, singer and actress
 Arpine Hovhannisyan (born 1983), Armenian politician
 Arpine Pehlivanian (?–2004), Armenian-American classical singer
 Arpine Martoyan, who uses the stage name Maléna (singer)

See also 
Arpino (disambiguation)
Lapine (disambiguation)

References 

Given names
Armenian feminine given names